Zurabishvili is a Georgian surname. Notable people with the surname include:

 David Zurabishvili (born 1957), Georgian politician
 Salome Zurabishvili (born 1952), Georgian politician and diplomat

Georgian-language surnames